DR 6 is a cluster of stars in the Milky Way galaxy, composed of dust, gas, and about 10 large newborn stars, each roughly ten to twenty times the size of the Sun. It was discovered by astronomers at NASA with the Spitzer Space Telescope, viewing the nebula using infrared light.

The areas of the cluster that appear green are mainly composed of gas, while the parts that seem to be red are made of dust.

The DR 6 nebula is located about 3,900 light-years away in the constellation Cygnus. The center of the nebula, where the ten stars are located, is roughly 3.5 light-years long, roughly equivalent to the distance between the Sun and Alpha Centauri, the closest star to the Sun.

"Galactic Ghoul"
The DR 6 cluster is also nicknamed the "Galactic Ghoul" because of the nebula's resemblance to a human face; astronomers have described it as "some sort of freakish space face," emphasizing the cavity-like regions that look like eyes and a mouth. These large cavities are the result of "energetic light" and strong stellar wind that come from the ten stars in the center of the nebula (the part also known as the "nose").

Because of the nebula's spooky appearance, it was featured on the NASA website as the Astronomy Picture of the Day on All Hallows Eve, November 1, 2004.

References

Open clusters
Pre-stellar nebulae
Star-forming regions
Cygnus (constellation)